Pawnee initially refers to a Native American people and its language:
 Pawnee people
 Pawnee language

Pawnee is also the name of several places in the United States:
 Pawnee, Illinois
 Pawnee, Kansas
 Pawnee, Missouri
 Pawnee City, Nebraska
 Pawnee, Ohio
 Pawnee, Oklahoma
 Pawnee, Texas
 Pawnee National Grassland, Colorado
 Pawnee Township (disambiguation)
 Pawnee County (disambiguation)

Pawnee may also refer to:
 Pawnee Agency and Boarding School Historic District, an area in Pawnee County, Oklahoma
 Pawnee Aviation, an American helicopter manufacturer
 Piper PA-25 Pawnee, agricultural aircraft produced by Piper Aircraft
 Piper PA-36 Pawnee Brave, agricultural aircraft produced by Piper Aircraft
 Hiller VZ-1 Pawnee, experimental aircraft
 Pawnee (Parks and Recreation), the fictional setting of the NBC television comedy Parks and Recreation
 Pawnee (film), starring George Montgomery

Language and nationality disambiguation pages